Paladino is a surname of Italian origin. The name is the Italian word for paladin. Notable people with the surname include:

 Carl Paladino (born 1946), American businessman and politician
 Giovanni Paolo Paladino (fl. 1540–1560), Italian composer and lutenist
 Joe Paladino, English footballer and coach
 Juan Paladino (born 1925), Uruguayan fencer
 Mimmo Paladino (born Domenico Paladino, 1948), Italian artist
 Silvie Paladino (born 1971), Australian entertainer
 Sascha Paladino (born 1976), American film director and stepbrother of banjo player Bela Fleck

Fictional characters:
 Simon J. Paladino or Gazerbeam, a fictional character from the 2004 film The Incredibles

See also
 Parque Abraham Paladino, a multi-use stadium in Montevideo, Uruguay
 Palladino, a surname
 Palatino (disambiguation)